Roberta Rabellotti is an Italian professor of economics at the Department of Business and Management at Aalborg University. Furthermore, Rabellotti is employed as a professor of economics at the University of Pavia.

Education 
In 1988, Roberta Rabellotti obtained her Master's degree (Ms.c.) in development economics from the University of Oxford. In 1995, she received a PhD from the Institute of Development Studies at the University of Sussex.

Career 
Roberta Rabellotti is specialised in innovation economics, development economics, and regional economics. She has been particularly occupied with, and contributed to, research within development economics, regional economics, innovation in developing countries, clusters and small enterprises, multinationals and Global Value Chains.
 
As part of her working career, she has been part of UNCTAD, Orkestra, Inter-American Development Bank, ILO, EC, ECLAC, and UNIDO. Additionally, Rabellotti has functioned as a board member at different organisations. These include positions as:
 
 Member of the scientific board Società Italiana degli Economisti.
 Member of the International Advisory Board of CIRCLE, Lund University.

References 

Living people
Academic staff of Aalborg University
Academic staff of the University of Pavia
Italian economists
University of Sussex
Alumni of the University of Oxford
Development economists
Theory of value (economics)
Innovation economists
Inter-American Development Bank
International Labour Organization people
United Nations Industrial Development Organization people
United Nations Economic Commission for Europe
United Nations conferences
Lund University
Year of birth missing (living people)